Antigua is a town and a municipality in the central part of the island of Fuerteventura in the Province of Las Palmas in the Canary Islands. It has a population of 11,629 (2013), and an area of 250.56 km². It is situated 17 km southwest of the capital of the island Puerto del Rosario.

Main sights
Caleta de Fuste Castle, a heritage site
Centro Turístico Cultural Molino de Antigua (Molino de Antigua Cultural Touristic Centre): where works of major artists are exposed. 
Salinas de El Carmen, the origin of these salt mines dates back to 1800
Paisaje Protegido del Malpaís Grande (Malpaís Grande Protected Landscape)
Atalayita aboriginal town
Cuchillos de Vigán, a natural Monument
Caldera de Gairía, a national monument

See also
List of municipalities in Las Palmas

References

External links

Antigua Information and map

Municipalities in Fuerteventura